Yizo Yizo was a South African television drama series which aired from 1999 to 2004 on SABC 1.

Synopsis
The series was set in a fictional school, Supatsela High, in a township of Johannesburg.

In the first series, the school's dictatorial principal, Mr. Mthembu, is forced to leave after beating a pupil. His successor, Ken Mokoena, is weak and corrupt and allows the school to be taken over by gangs, until he is replaced by Grace Letsatsi, who works with the school community to rebuild the school and expel the criminal elements.

Cast
Meshack Mavuso – Jabulani "Javas" Nyembe
Tshepo Ngwane – Thabo Nonyane (Thiza)
Charmaine Mtinta – Nomsa (series 1)
Nomonde Gongxeka – Hazel (series 1)
Noluthando Maleka – Dudu (series 1)
Lorraine Mphephi – Mantwa
Dumisane Khumalo – Sticks
Christopher Kubheka – Gunman
Ernest Msibi – Chester Serote
 Ronnie Nyakale – Ben "Papa Action" Mokoena (series 1)
 Bonginkosi Dlamini – Papa Action (series 2)
 Sthandiwe Kgoroge – Zoe Cele

Production
Yizo Yizo was commissioned by the South African Department of Education to address problems in township schools as part of a campaign called Culture of Learning, Teaching and Service (COLTS). The series aimed to provide positive role models and depict the process of restoring a typical urban school in a South African township. The Department worked with the education division of the South African Broadcasting Corporation to develop storylines, then commissioned Laduma Film Factory (later renamed Bomb Productions) to produce the series.

The series was filmed in the township of Daveyton.

See also
Yizo Yizo (soundtrack)

References

External links

1999 South African television series debuts
2004 South African television series endings
South African drama television series
SABC 1 original programming
1990s teen drama television series
2000s teen drama television series